The History Boys is a play by British playwright Alan Bennett. The play premiered at the Royal National Theatre in London on 18 May 2004. Its Broadway debut was on 23 April 2006 at the Broadhurst Theatre where 185 performances were staged before it closed on 1 October 2006.

The play won multiple awards, including the 2005 Laurence Olivier Award for Best New Play and the 2006 Tony Award for Best Play.

Plot
The play opens in Cutlers' Grammar School, Sheffield, a fictional boys' grammar school in the north of England. Set in the mid-late 1980s, the play follows a group of history pupils preparing for the Oxford and Cambridge entrance examinations under the guidance of three teachers (Hector, Irwin, and Lintott) with contrasting styles.

Hector, an eccentric teacher, delights in knowledge for its own sake but his ambitious headmaster wants the school to move up the academic league table and hires Irwin, a supply teacher, to introduce a rather more cynical and ruthless style of teaching. Hector is discovered sexually fondling a boy and later Irwin's latent homosexual inclinations emerge.

The character of Hector was based on the schoolmaster and author Frank McEachran (1900–1975).

Characters

 Headmaster (Felix Armstrong) – Headmaster 
 Douglas Hector – English and General Studies teacher
 Irwin – History teacher; brought in as a special coach
 Mrs Dorothy Lintott – History teacher
 Akthar – Pupil; of Asian ancestry, Muslim
 Crowther – Pupil; acts as a hobby
 Dakin – Pupil; handsome, object of Posner's and Irwin's affection
 Lockwood – Pupil; strong opinions
 David Posner – Pupil; youngest, gay and Jewish
 Rudge – Pupil; better known for athletic skills than for intelligence
 Scripps – Pupil; Anglican, plays piano
 Timms – Pupil; joker, overweight
 Director on Irwin's television programme (a small role)

Irwin is said to be modelled after Niall Ferguson.

The play includes several non-speaking roles:
 Make-Up Woman, Production team – on Irwin's television show
 Three or four unidentified MPs – spoken to by Irwin in opening scene
 Other male pupils
 Fiona – Headmaster's secretary; object of Dakin's affection. Does not appear on stage in the published text, but was seen in filmed projections featuring Rio by Duran Duran during the original production.

Productions

Royal National Theatre
The play opened at the Lyttelton Theatre (part of the National Theatre) in London on 18 May 2004, directed by Nicholas Hytner. It played to sell-out audiences and its limited run was frequently extended. Richard Griffiths, James Corden, Dominic Cooper, Russell Tovey, Sacha Dhawan, Samuel Barnett, Jamie Parker and Andrew Knott were among the original cast. On 24 November 2005, the same production was revived once again at the Lyttelton Theatre where it played another successful run. Matt Smith took on the role of Lockwood in the November 2005 revision of the cast. The original cast reunited in the final week in February 2006.

International tour
Following closing in London, the National Theatre production toured to Hong Kong in February 2006 and featured in the 2006  New Zealand International Arts Festival held in Wellington (February 2006) before playing at the Sydney Theatre in Sydney, Australia from 4 March to 8 April 2006. At each venue, the play was presented to sell-out audiences with the original London cast, including Richard Griffiths; however, Frances de la Tour and Clive Merrison were replaced by Maggie Steed and Malcolm Sinclair until the Broadway season.

Broadway
The American premiere of the play took place on 23 April 2006 when the same National production opened on Broadway at the Broadhurst Theatre. Originally scheduled to run through 2 September 2006, the run was extended through to 8 October 2006 following huge public demand after the show won the Tony, New York Critics Circle and other American theatrical awards.

West End
Following its Broadway triumph and second UK tour, the play opened at London's Wyndham's Theatre on 2 January 2007, following previews from 20 December 2006. The production closed on 14 April 2007. A further West End run of the play opened once again at Wyndham's Theatre on 20 December 2007 running through 26 April 2008.

Tours in the UK and Ireland
The first national tour of the production opened in 2005, continuing to play nine regional venues. A second Britain wide tour began on 31 August 2006 at the Birmingham Repertory Theatre, touring to eight further venues. The third tour launched on 6 September 2007 at the Theatre Royal, Plymouth, before continuing to Truro, Cheltenham, Bath, Dublin, Blackpool, Leeds, Cambridge and Eastbourne, culminating in Newcastle on 10 November 2007.

Royal National Theatre casts

A majority of the original cast reunited on 2 November 2013 for the National Theatre 50th Anniversary special and performed the French lesson scene, with Philip Correia taking over for Russell Tovey, Marc Elliott performing as Akthar, original Akthar actor Sacha Dhawan as Posner (as Samuel Barnett was performing in Richard III/Twelfth Night on Broadway at the time) and playwright Alan Bennett taking over as Hector from Richard Griffiths, who had died in March 2013.

West Yorkshire Playhouse / Theatre Royal Bath tour
A fourth national tour co-produced by the West Yorkshire Playhouse and Theatre Royal Bath commenced in early 2010. This was a new production not produced by the National Theatre and directed by Christopher Luscombe. The cast were as follows:

 Headmaster: Thomas Wheatley
 Hector: Gerard Murphy
 Irwin: Ben Lambert
 Mrs. Lintott: Penny Beaumont
 Akthar: Beruce Khan
 Crowther: Tom Reed
 Dakin: Kyle Redmond-Jones
 Lockwood: George Banks
 Posner: James Byng
 Rudge: Peter McGovern
 Scripps: Rob Delaney
 Timms: Christopher Keegan

After a successful run the West Yorkshire Playhouse/Bath Theatre Royal production was revived for 2011 with the following cast:

 Headmaster: Thomas Wheatley
 Hector: Philip Franks
 Irwin: Ben Lambert
 Mrs. Lintott: Penny Beaumont
 Akthar: Beruce Khan
 Crowther: Michael Lyle
 Dakin: George Banks
 Lockwood: Ryan Saunders
 Posner: Rob Delaney
 Rudge: Peter McGovern
 Scripps: Harry Waller
 Timms: Christopher Keegan

Other productions

The play had its southwest USA premiere at Uptown Players, in Dallas, from 3 April to 3 May 2009.
The first non-professional UK production was staged by Daisy and Rose Theatre Productions at Ermysted's Grammar School in Skipton, North Yorkshire, on 28–30 August 2008.
 The play had its amateur debut in Melbourne, Australia, performed at the Cromwell Road Theatre from 18–25 July 2009 and directed by Bryce Ives . The first amateur production of the play (text released by Samuel French, Inc.) was performed at the St Helens Theatre Royal, on 19–22 August 2009.
The play made its Chicago premiere on 25 April 2009, at TimeLine Theatre.
The Netherlands premiere was presented on 1 October 2009 by The Queen's English Theatre Company at the CREA Theater, Amsterdam – featuring an English mother-tongue cast, starring Brian André as Hector and directed by Mark Winstanley. The same production formed the play's premiere at the Edinburgh International Festival in August 2010.
An Italian adaptation debuted on 19 September 2010 at Teatro ElfoPuccini in Milan, directed by Elio de Capitani and Ferdinando Bruni. It won the Premio UBU 2011 as best show.
A Catalan adaptation debuted on 24 September 2008 at Teatre Goya in Barcelona. Director: Josep Maria Pou. 
 The Sydney debut was performed at the Sydney Opera House by the Peach Theatre Company from 8 February to 2 March 2013, starring John Wood as Hector, Heather Mitchell as Mrs Linnott, Paul Goddard as Head Master, James Mackay as Irwin, Dakin:Lindsay Farris,  Scripps: Aaron Tsindos. Crowther: Simon Brook McLachlan. Lockwood: Caleb Alloway. Arthur: James Elliott. Posner:Matthew Backer. Rudge: Gary Brun. Timms: Matt Hardie and is directed by Jesse Peach.

Film adaptation

In October 2006 a film adaptation of the play was released in the United States, and later in November 2006 in Britain. The film, also titled The History Boys, was directed by Nicholas Hytner and featured the original stage cast.

Awards and nominations

Original London production

Original Broadway production

References

Further reading

External links 
 
 
 
 The History Boys at the Royal National Theatre
 The History Boys – Richard Wortley's radio production; original National Theatre cast

Plays by Alan Bennett
LGBT-related plays
British plays adapted into films
Mass media in Sheffield
Royal National Theatre
Broadway plays
West End plays
2004 plays
Drama Desk Award-winning plays
New York Drama Critics' Circle Award winners
Laurence Olivier Award-winning plays
Tony Award-winning plays